Inside of You may refer to:

Inside of You, an album by Aaron Hall
"Inside of You" (Hoobastank song)
"Inside of You" (The Maine song)
"Inside of You", a song by the Walker Brothers from the album Lines
"Inside of You", a song by Ray, Goodman & Brown
"Inside of You", a song by fictional band Infant Sorrow from the film Forgetting Sarah Marshall
 Inside of You (album)
Inside of You, a podcast hosted by Michael Rosenbaum